Septotrapelia multiseptata is a species of bryophilous (moss-dwelling) lichen in the family Byssolomataceae. Found in South Korea, it was formally described as a new species in 2014 by lichenologists André Aptroot and Kwang-Hee Moon. The thallus lacks a cortex; rather, it comprises small, irregularly shaped areoles on a somewhat gelatinous crust. The photobiont partner of the lichen is an myrmecioid green alga, which measures 2–4 μm in diameter. Ascospores of the lichen have a long ellipsoid shape, and measure 17–20 by 6.5–7.5 μm. The species epithet multiseptata refers to the 5 or 6 septa that divide the ascospores into chambers.

References

Lecanorales
Lichen species
Lichens described in 2014
Taxa named by André Aptroot
Lichens of Eastern Asia